Lasse Lappalainen (born 7 June 1989) is a Finnish professional ice hockey player. He is currently playing for KalPa of the Finnish Liiga.

Lasse Lappalainen made his Liiga debut playing with SaiPa during the 2014-15 Liiga season.

References

External links

1989 births
Living people
KooKoo players
SaPKo players
Finnish ice hockey defencemen
People from Kuopio
Sportspeople from North Savo